The 1931 Chicago Cardinals season was their 12th in the league. The team improved on their previous output of 5–6–2, losing only four games. They finished fourth in the league. The team played its first five games on the road and played six games in the month of November.

Schedule

Standings

References

1931
Chicago Cardinals
Chicago